Sara Anzanello (30 July 1980 – 25 October 2018) was an Italian volleyball player in the middle hitter-blocker role.

Biography
Anzanello was born in San Donà di Piave, province of Venice. She debuted for Italy national team in 1998, when she was 17 years old. She had a total of 203 caps for her team.

Health and death
In 2013, Anzanello required a liver transplant after contracting a severe form of hepatitis in Azerbaijan. She recovered and returned to the playing field. However, in mid-2017, she was diagnosed with leukemia. She died a year later in October 2018 at age 38.

Clubs
  1995-1998	 Volley Latisana
  1998-1999	 Club Italia	
  1999-2001	 AGIL Trecate
  2001-2009	 Asystel Novara
  2009-2011	 GSO Villa Cortese
  2011-2013	 Azərreyl Baku

Individual awards
 2006 FIVB World Grand Prix "Best Blocker"
 Walk of Fame of Italian sport: 2019

References

External links
 
 Official website 
 LegaVolley 

1980 births
2018 deaths
People from San Donà di Piave
Italian women's volleyball players
Deaths from cancer in Lombardy
Deaths from leukemia
Sportspeople from the Metropolitan City of Venice
21st-century Italian women